Big Brother Albania 9, also known as Big Brother - Love Edition, was the ninth season of the Albanian television series of the worldwide franchise of Big Brother. It started on March 18, 2017 and ended on June 24, 2017 on Top Channel. The show ran for 99 days. The winner received 15,000,000 Leks (€100,000) and for the first time in the Big Brother Albania history the winner would be a couple. The winner couple was Danjel Dedndreaj & Fotini Derxho. The main host is again Arbana Osmani who returned for the eighth time, after taking the previous season off due to pregnancy.

Big Brother Fans' Club returned with the main host Albana Osmani, and Olti Curri being part of the show. The Fans' Club show featured dialogues with evicted contestants, housemates from the previous series and fans of the show. Big Bastards the new show for Big Brother Albania 9, it was airing after the Live Eviction Show.

The live eviction show was every Saturday at 21:00 CET, while every day of the week at 16:00 was a one-hour episode, that showed what happens into the house. Fans' Club was every Sunday from 13:00 to 15:00. Big Bastards was after the live eviction show for about 15 to 20 minutes.

Like all the previous seasons, two 24/7 live PPV channels, with the name Big Brother 1 and Big Brother 2, were made available on DigitAlb since the start of the show.

Auditions

Auditions for Big Brother Albania 9 was taken in Tirane and Pristina.

Open auditions

Producers auditions commenced on 6 January in Tirane and ended on 30 January again in Tirane.

Housemates 
On Day 1, 10 single housemates and 5 couples entered the house.
Viewers will have three weeks to decide who will be the new couples.
From Day 1, the 10 singles housemates were in another house and the 5 couples in another house.
8 couples entered the house on Day 50.
From Week 10, Ambra and Elsamed no longer a couple. They are playing the game separately.

Bachelor House and Couple House

Summary

Nominations table

Notes 

 : Only Couple House housemates could nominate this week.
 : Denis & Gerta were automatically nominated due to rule breaking.
 : Donjeta & Damiano voluntarily left the House on Day 11 due to Donjeta who wanted to leave the house, but Damiano returned by the most public votes on Day 15.
 : Egnajt & Kleodiana were ejected because they didn't accept to play together as a couple.
 : Liridon was evicted because he had the fewest votes to become a couple with any of the girl housemates.
 : Damiano, Olsi and Ervini were automatically nominated with their couple due to rule breaking.
 : Armela & Damiano were ejected because Damiano violated the basic rules of big brother.
 : There were no nominations and eviction on Week 8, instead the public was voted for their favorite couple which would be immune on Week 9 and this couple is Danjel & Fotini.
 : Fiorentina & Olsi and Katerina & Lupçe were automatically nominated for breaking the rules.
 : From Week 10, Ambra & Elsamed are no longer a couple.
 : There were no nominations and eviction on Week 11, instead the public was voted for their favorite couple which would be immune on Week 12 and this couple is Dona & Musa.
 : In a double eviction night, all housemates were nominated for the second round. The one with the most votes was evicted.
 : In a triple eviction night, all housemates were nominated for the second and third round. The one with the most votes in second round was automatical finalist and that couple was Katerina & Lupçe and then in the third round the one with the most votes was evicted.
 : The public voted to win rather than to evict.

Nominations totals received

References

External links
 Official Website

09
2017 Albanian television seasons